The following is a list of notable events and releases of the year 1961 in Norwegian music.

Events

May
 The 9th Bergen International Festival started in Bergen, Norway.

July
 The 1st Moldejazz started in Molde, Norway.

Deaths

 February
 19 –  Einar Fagstad, accordionist, singer, actor and composer (born 1899).

 August
 28 –  Carsten Carlsen, pianist and composer (born 1892).

Births

 January
 7 – Nils Økland, Hardanger fiddle player.
 13 – Sinikka Langeland, traditional folk singer and kantele player.
 16 – Kenneth Sivertsen, jazz guitarist, composer, poet, and comedian (died 2006).

 February
 12 – Knut Reiersrud, jazz and blues guitarist, composer, and program host.

 March
 2 – Harald Dahlstrøm, jazz pianist and Hammond B3 organist.
 23 – Eivind Aarset, jazz guitarist and composer.

 April
 25
 Paul Wagnberg, jazz organist, pianist, and composer.
 Truls Mørk, classical cellist.
 26 – Knut Nesbø, guitarist for Di Derre (died 2013).

 May
 29 – Glenn Erik Haugland, contemporary composer.

 June
 22 – Asbjørn Schaathun, contemporary composer.

 July
 8 – Karl Seglem, jazz saxophonist, bukkehorn player, composer, and record producer.

 September
 6 – Paul Waaktaar-Savoy, musician and songwriter for A-ha and Savoy.

 October
 14 – Knut Vaage, contemporary composer.
 20 – Audun Kleive, jazz drummer and percussionist.

 December
 13 – Per Øystein Sørensen, singer and songwriter for Fra Lippo Lippi.
 30 – Rolf Lislevand, performer of Early music specialising on lute, vihuela, baroque guitar and theorbo.

See also
 1961 in Norway
 Music of Norway

References

 
Norwegian music
Norwegian
Music
1960s in Norwegian music